Rednaxela Terrace is a pedestrian-only street in Mid-Levels, Hong Kong.

Name
Although there are no official conclusions to the origin of the name, it is believed that the road was part of the property owned by a Mr. Alexander, and Rednaxela is an understandable transposition of the English name Alexander, since the Chinese language was typically written right-to-left at the time. Most of the naming errors in Hong Kong are a result of incorrect transliterations. Another explanation is that the name is linked to abolitionist Robert Alexander Young, who was known to have used the name Rednaxela in his 1829 work Ethiopian Manifesto. Chinese transliteration followed suit and was adopted by the neighbourhood, and the government never made any further alterations.

History
From December 1891 to June 1892, the Filipino revolutionary and national hero José Rizal lived with his family at Number 2, Rednaxela Terrace, then working as an eye clinician in Hong Kong. The Hong Kong government erected a commemorative plaque in 2004 on the intersection of Rednaxela Terrace and Shelley Street to honour Rizal.

Residential buildings 

Rednaxela Terrace only has a few residential buildings, with Caine Road on its north, Central-Mid-levels Escalator and Jamia Mosque on its east, 

Rednaxela Terrace is considered a convenient location for local residents and expatriates. 1 Rednaxela Terrace is a building called The Rednaxela developed by Yu Tai Hing Company Ltd, which was completed in 1998.

8 Rednaxela Terrace is named as ACTS Rednaxela and developed by Goldig Investment Group. Carl Gouw, representing ACTS and the developer, collaborated with Gary Chang and EDGE Design Institute on designing the building. It received a Design For Asia Merit award from Hong Kong Design Centre and was featured in Apple TV’s Home. Goldig sold ACTS Rednaxela in 2012 for HK$ 200m and ACTS continued with the serviced apartments operations for a few years. The building model is exhibited at M+ museum of West Kowloon Cultural District.

References

Mid-Levels
Roads on Hong Kong Island